The 2022 California lieutenant gubernatorial election was held on November 8, 2022, to elect the lieutenant governor of the state of California. The election coincided with various other federal and state elections, including for Governor of California. The nonpartisan blanket primary was held on June 7. California is one of 21 states that elects its lieutenant governor separately from its governor.

Incumbent Democratic Lieutenant Governor Eleni Kounalakis is running for re-election to a second term. She was first elected in 2018 with 56.6% of the vote against Democratic opponent Ed Hernandez.

Candidates 
A primary election is scheduled for June 7, 2022. Under California law, all candidates appear on the same ballot under a nonpartisan blanket primary, with the top two finishers advancing to the general election.

Democratic Party

Declared 
 Eleni Kounalakis, incumbent lieutenant governor
 Jeffrey Highbear Morgan, businessman and engineer
 William Cavett "Skee" Saacke, attorney

Disqualified 
 Roy Foreman, construction worker

Republican Party

Declared 
 David Fennell, venture capitalist and candidate in 2018
 Clint W. Saunders, mental health worker
 Angela Underwood Jacobs, deputy mayor of Lancaster

Peace and Freedom Party

Declared 
 Mohammad Arif, businessman

No Party Preference

Declared 
 David Hillberg, mechanic and actor
 James Orlando Ogle, perennial candidate (write-in)

Endorsements

Primary election

Results

General election

Polling

Results

Notes

References 

Lieutenant Gubernatorial
California
2022